Johnny Brenner (born 1971) is a retired Irish hurling midfielder who formerly played with De La Salle GAA at club level and with Waterford GAA at inter-county level.

Johnny was part of Waterford's 1992 All-Ireland Under 21 Hurling Championship winning team.  Johnny also played at senior level for Waterford GAA until 1998, making a brief return for the 2001 All-Ireland Hurling Championship.

Honours
 All-Ireland Under 21 Hurling Championship winner - 1992
 Munster Under-21 Hurling Championship winner - 1992

References

External links
 Hogan Stand article

1971 births
Living people
Waterford inter-county hurlers
De La Salle hurlers
Irish people of German descent